"In My Bed" is a song by American R&B group Dru Hill. It is the second single from their eponymous debut album. The single spent three weeks at number-one on the US R&B chart and peaked at number four on the US pop chart. The song is performed by group leader Mark "Sisqó" Andrews. The music video focuses on Sisqó's girlfriend, who possibly cheats on him with another man, but Sisqó doesn't know anything about it. At the end of the video, Sisqó goes to his house with a bouquet of flowers for his girlfriend when he sees a guy walking out. He goes inside and sadly finds her in bed with a woman and drops the flowers in heartbreak. He leaves the house for a few seconds and goes back in. The remix features Jermaine Dupri, who also produced the track, and Da Brat. It was a hit single. The remix sampled Le Pamplemousse's "Gimme What You Got" (1976). The song appears in 2008 video game Grand Theft Auto IV.

Music video
The original music video was directed by Bille Woodruff. The So So Def music video remix is directed by Darren Grant.

Track listing

Charts

Weekly charts

Year-end charts

Certifications

|}

See also
R&B number-one hits of 1997 (USA)

References

1997 singles
Dru Hill songs
Music videos directed by Bille Woodruff
Island Records singles
1996 songs
Songs written by Daryl Simmons
Song recordings produced by Daryl Simmons
Songs about infidelity
Contemporary R&B ballads
Soul ballads